David A. Levinson is an American television and soap opera writer, originally from Falmouth, Massachusetts.  He is a 1997 graduate of Emerson College in Boston.

Career
All My Children (hired by Gordon Rayfield)
Script Writer: March 2003 - January 14, 2004

As the World Turns (hired by Jean Passanante)
Breakdown Writer: April 4, 2007 - January 24, 2008, April 18, 2008 - June 20, 2008
Script Writer: November 27, 2006 - April 3, 2007, June 23, 2008 - November 24, 2009
Script Editor: November 25, 2009 - June 25, 2010

Days of Our Lives  (hired by Marlene Clark Poulter & Darrell Ray Thomas, Jr) 
Script Writer: June 2011 - 2013, 2017

One Life to Live (hired by Lorraine Broderick)
Script Writer: 2001 - 2002

Sunset Beach (hired by Gary Tomlin)
Research and Continuity Supervisor: 1998 - 1999
Production Assistant: 1997 - 1998

The Young and the Restless (hired by Josh Griffith)
Sub Script Writer: June 21, 2013

Live Through This
Staff Writer, 2 out of 13 episodes: 1999-2000

Awards and nominations
Daytime Emmy Awards

 Winner
2013 - Best Writing; Days of Our Lives

Nominations
2011 - Best Writing; As the World Turns
2010 - Best Writing; As the World Turns
2004 - Best Writing; All My Children
2002 - Best Writing; One Life to Live

Writers Guild of America Award
2014 (win - "Days of Our Lives")
2010 (win - "As the World Turns")
2009 (win - "As the World Turns")
2008 (nomination - "As the World Turns")
2007 (nomination - "As the World Turns")
2003 (win - "All My Children")

References

External links

American soap opera writers
American male television writers
American male writers
Living people
Writers Guild of America Award winners
American male screenwriters
Year of birth missing (living people)